Hauwa Ojeifo (born 1992) is a Nigerian sexual violence and mental health activist. She is known to be the first Nigerian female to have received a Queen's Young Leader Award for her work.

Early life and education 
Ojeifo attended the University of Reading in England where she acquired a Master of Science degree in Investment Banking and Islamic Finance.

Career 
During her teenage and early adult life years she struggled with depression. In February 2016, Ojeifo attempted suicide. And in 2014, she was sexually abused. She was also Diagnosed  with bipolar and post traumatic stress disorder with mild psychosis. To turn her difficult experiences into something positive, she founded the She Writes Woman foundation in April 2016. And through her foundation, she provides support to sexual abuse victims and people in the West Africa who need mental health care .

In February 2020, during Nigeria's bid to pass its first mental health law, Ojeifo is known to have defended the rights of people with mental health conditions and psychosocial disabilities before the Nigerian parliament, making her the first woman to have done something of this sort.

Awards and Achievements 
Aside receiving a Queen's Young Leader Award for her work in 2018, Ojeifo has won several other awards including the following:

 In 2017, Ojeifo was honoured as the Possibilities Woman 2017 by IWOW
 She was also selected as an honouree of the AstraZeneca  Young Health Programme scholarship to the One Young World summit in The Hague, Netherlands
 In 2018, she was awarded the MTV EMA Generation Change Award in Bilbao, Spain.
 In 2019, She became an Obama Foundation Leader.

References

External link 

Living people
Nigerian women activists
1992 births
Alumni of the University of Reading